Elixabete Capa Cia is a Spanish former football goalkeeper who played for Añorga KKE and Athletic Bilbao in the Superliga Femenina. She was a member of the Spain women's national football team for nearly a decade, taking part in the 1997 European Championship, where la Roja reached the semifinals, as Roser Serra's reserve. She retired in 2005 at 27, after winning her third league in a row with Athletic and playing the 2005 European Championship qualifying.

In 2007, she was Real Sociedad's assistant manager.

References

1978 births
Living people
Spanish women's footballers
Spain women's international footballers
Footballers from San Sebastián
Primera División (women) players
Añorga KKE players
Athletic Club Femenino players
Women's association football goalkeepers